A distinct Indo-Islamic architecture style with local contribution is reflected in the historical buildings of Hyderabad, making it the first and "Best Heritage City of India" as of March 2012. The city houses many famous historical sites constructed during Qutb Shahi and Asaf Jahi period, including various mosques and palaces.

Hindu Temple Architecture is also seen in the temples of Hyderabad, including the Birla Mandir, Jagannath Temple and Akanna Madanna Temple. Modern architectural styles are seen in most buildings constructed after independence.

Golconda Sultanate (1591–1687 CE) 

Qutb Shahi architecture of the 16th and early 17th centuries followed classical Persian architecture featuring domes and colossal arches. Inscriptions in Persian and elaborately carved stucco work are found on most of these buildings. The oldest surviving Qutb Shahi structure in Hyderabad is the ruins of Golconda fort built in the 16th century.

The most important monuments from this time are the Charminar and Mecca Masjid, both built by Mohammed Quli Qutb Shah, the founder of Hyderabad. Most of the historical bazaars that still exist were constructed on the street north of Charminar towards the fort. The Charminar has become an icon of the city, located in the center of old Hyderabad. At each corner stands a -high minaret.

To the north of the Charminar is a public square enclosed by four giant arches, known as the Char Kaman. A fountain called Gulzar Houz is at the center of this area.

Another example is the Qutb Shahi Tombs complex, a complex of tombs of the Qutb Shahi rulers, as well as other royals and noblemen. The domes were originally overlaid with blue and green tiles, of which only a few pieces now remain. The tombs are set in a garden. The complex includes a step-well, turkish bath, and a mosque.

The Charminar, Golconda Fort and the Qutb Shahi tombs are considered to be monuments of national importance in India. In 2010, the Indian government proposed that the sites be listed for UNESCO World Heritage status.

The style is also seen in the Taramati Baradari, Khairtabad Mosque, Musheerabad Mosque, Shaikpet Sarai, and Toli Masjid.

Mughal period (1687–1724 CE) 

The only significant architectural contribution during the brief Mughal rule in Hyderabad was the construction the city wall of Hyderabad, constructed out of granite in typical Mughal defence architecture. The wall had twelve gateways, each wide enough for an elephant to pass through. Mughal emperor Aurangzeb also completed the construction of the Mecca Masjid, adding a gateway and topping the minarets with domes.

Nizams of Hyderabad (1724-1948 CE) 
The Nizams of Hyderabad ruled between the 18th and 20th centuries as vassals of the British Empire. Therefore, European architectural styles became prevalent during this period.

Apart from the Nizams' palaces, the noble families built their own palaces and mansions in Indo-European styles. This includes Diwan Devdi, Asman Garh Palace, Errum Manzil, Khursheed Jah Devdi, Bashir Bagh Palace, Bella Vista, Hill Fort Palace, and Paigah Palace.

With the introduction of a sizable Christian population, churches including the St. Joseph's Cathedral, St. George's Church, CSI Garrison Wesley Church, and Holy Trinity Church were built in the city, especially in and around Secunderabad, the new city built as a British cantonment.

Neoclassical 

The British Residency, completed in 1798, was probably the first major example of neoclassical architecture in Hyderabad.

The Falaknuma Palace, used as a guest-house by the Nizam, was inspired by Andrea Palladio's villas. The Nizams applied European styles in some of the palaces such as Falaknuma and King Kothi Palaces.

Indo-Saracenic 

In the 17th century, Asaf Jahi architecture emerged with palatial style outweighed secular construction. The earliest examples include the Purani Haveli, which served as the seat of the Nizam until the Chowmahalla Palace was constructed. The Chowmahalla Palace, located a stone's throw away from Charminar was constructed over a period of 100 years. It was recently restored and opened to the public. A wide variety of Indian and European styles, ranging from baroque to neoclassical, are seen in the palace

The last Nizam Mir Osman Ali Khan is called as the maker of modern Hyderabad. The buildings constructed during his reign are impressive and represent a rich style of Indo-Saracenic architecture, such as the Osmania University and Moazzam Jahi Market. These buildings are quite distinct from their earlier Qutb Shahi counterparts.

In the early 20th century, the Nizam invited British architect Vincent Esch to design four major public buildings of Hyderabad — the Hyderabad High Court, Osmania General Hospital, City College, and Kachiguda Railway Station. Esch, a pioneer of the contemporary Indo-Saracenic style designed these building in this style combining Indo-Islamic and European features.

The Spanish Mosque, Paigah Tombs, Mahbub Mansion, Saidani Ma Tomb, Aza Khana-e-Zohra, Hill Fort Palace, and Nizamia Hospital, also contribute to the architecture of this period.

Art Deco 
Art deco buildings were built in the 1930s and 1940s. The Mouzam Jahi Market, SBH Building, and a number of cinema halls are examples.

Post-Independence (1947 CE – present) 

Modern architectural styles dominate the newer areas of the city.

References

Citations

Bibliography

Further reading
Bulletin of the Deccan College Post-Graduate and Research Institute, Volume 22 (1963)

Hyderabad